Lorna Vevers (born 31 January 1981, in Dumfries) is a Scottish curler living in Lockerbie. She won a bronze medal at the 2007 World Championships. She played lead for Team Great Britain at the 2010 Winter Olympics.

Vevers' 2010 Olympic coach was Nancy Murdoch, also from the Lockerbie rink.

Teammates 

2007 Aormori World Championships

Kelly Wood, Skip

Jackie Lockhart, Third

Lindsay Wood, Lead

Karen Addison, Alternate

2009 Aberdeen European Championships

2010 Vancouver Olympic Games

Eve Muirhead, Skip

Jackie Lockhart, Third

Kelly Wood, Second

Karen Addison, Alternate

References

External links

1981 births
Living people
Scottish female curlers
British female curlers
Olympic curlers of Great Britain
Curlers at the 2010 Winter Olympics
People from Lockerbie
Sportspeople from Dumfries and Galloway